Sherpur may refer to:

Bangladesh
Sherpur District, Mymensingh Division
Sherpur Sadar Upazila
Sherpur, Bogra
Sherpur Upazila

India
Sherpur, Sabarkantha, Gujarat
Sherpur, Punjab
Sherpur dogran, Kapurthala district, Punjab
Sherpur, Hindaun Block, Rajasthan
Sherpur, Ghazipur, Uttar Pradesh
Sherpur Kalan, Pilibhit, Uttar Pradesh

Afghanistan
 Sherpur Cantonment, Kabul
 Siege of the Sherpur Cantonment, 1879

Pakistan
Sherpur, Mansehra

See also

Sherpa (disambiguation)
Sherpura, town in Rajasthan, India